Methandriol diacetate, or methylandrostenediol diacetate, also known as 17α-methylandrost-5-ene-3β,17β-diol 3β,17β-diacetate, is a synthetic, injected anabolic–androgenic steroid (AAS) and a 17α-alkylated derivative of 5-androstenediol that was never marketed. It is an androgen ester – specifically, the C3,17β diacetate ester of methandriol (17α-methyl-5-androstenediol) – and acts as a prodrug of methandriol in the body.

See also
 Methandriol bisenanthoyl acetate
 Methandriol dipropionate
 Methandriol propionate
 Bolandiol dipropionate

References

Abandoned drugs
Acetate esters
Androgen esters
Androgens and anabolic steroids
Androstanes
Prodrugs
World Anti-Doping Agency prohibited substances